Daphnimorpha is a genus of flowering plants belonging to the family Thymelaeaceae.

Its native range is Southern Japan.

Species:
Daphnimorpha capitellata 
Daphnimorpha kudoi

References

Thymelaeaceae
Malvales genera